Dolichoderus albamaculus is a species of ant in the genus Dolichoderus. Described by Shattuck and Marsden in 2013, the species is widespread in arid regions of Australia, being found in many various habitats.

References

Dolichoderus
Hymenoptera of Australia
Insects described in 2013